Dakpa Sheri
(),
explained as "Pure Crystal Mountain" and also known as Tsari, is a mountain in the eponymously named Tsari region in Lhöntse County of Tibet's Shannan Prefecture. The mountain is considered sacred for Tibetans and the pilgrimage route circumambulates the mountain. Takpa Siri ridge consists of four hills/ passes and four water bodies.

Following border tensions between China and India, the pilgrimage was stopped after 1956.

Etymology 
Dakpa Sheri is usually classified as a néri (né–ri, abode–mountain) with the word "abode" being used in reference to deities. The Néri can be seen as the focus of Tibetan worship or kora.

The word Tsari (Tsa-ri) has been used for both the geographical area surrounding Dakpa Sheri as well as the mountain itself. Tsa is a consonant of the Tibetan script while ri means 'mountain'.

Variations include rTsá-ri which is explained as "Psychic Energy Channel Mountain", rTsa-ba which is explained as ''Foundation Mountain", Tswa-ri is explained as "Herb Mountain" and Tsa-ri rTswa-gon is "Superior Herb Psychic Energy Channel Mountain". The variation Tsa-ri-tra is a transliteration of the Sanskrit word Cáritra.

Exploration 
F. M.Bailey, H. T. Morshead, F. Ludlow, F. Kingdon-Ward have written about the mountain and the pilgrimage. In 1999, Toni Huber published his thesis on The Cult of the Pure Crystal Mountain.

Geography 
According to the Indian official T. S. Murty, Dakpa Sheri is located on the water-parting line of the Yume Chu and Pindigo rivers. Both the rivers are tributaries of the Subansiri River near the China–India Line of Actual Control, with Yume Chu being on the Chinese side  and the Pindigo river on the Indian side.

Ningkor and Ringkor pilgrimages

Tibetan Buddhists consider Tsari sacred, in the same league with Mount Kailash. Dakpa Sheri is regarded so sacred that its circumambulation is believed to derive as much merit as the circumambulation of Mount Kailas.

The circumambulation of the Dakpa Sheri (Takpa Siri or Tsari) is of two types: the Tsari Ningkor and the Tsari Ringkor. Tsari Ningkor is annual while the longer Tsari Ringkor (also called the Rongkor Chenmo) is twelve yearly. The Dakpa Sheri mountain attracts annual pilgrims who circle it over 3 days, passing through seven steep mountain passes. In addition, there is a larger pilgrimage that takes place once every 12 years that goes through the tribal territory of Assam Himalaya. It goes down to the confluence with the Subansiri river (Chayul Chu river). Then it follows Chayul Chu upstream and later Yume Chu, to return to the starting point at Chösam. The last Ringkor was in 1956. The next one due in 1968 as well as successive pilgrimages have not occurred due to border tensions between China and India. The pilgrimage is sometimes done along with a visit to the Tso Karpo or the Tsari Sarpa. These are respectively called the Tsari Nyingpa and the Tsari Sarpa. Before Tibet was anneed by China, the Migyitun (presently administered by China) town use to play a central role in the longer 12 year-pilgrimage. Tibetan officials and pilgrims numbering about 20,000 assembled in the town to make arrangements for the pilgrimage.

In order to induce the Assam Himalayan tribes (Tagin tribe) to allow unmolested passage to the pilgrims, the Tibetan government use to give lavish presents to them. Before the annexation of Tibet by China, Longju was outside of Tibet, it was south of the Tibetan frontier town of Migyitun, along the Tsari Chu river valley. The area was historically populated by the Mara clan of the Tagin tribe of Arunachal Pradesh. The border between Tibet and tribal territory was at the Mandala Plain just outside the town of Migyitun. There was a crossing on the river from its left bank to the right bank near Longju, which was needed to enter the Tagir tribal territory from the Tibetan. When Bailey and Morshead visited the area in 1905, they found the bridge broken. The Tibetans were unable to repair it because it was built using the tribal materials and techniques. Evidently the Tibetan authority stopped at Migyitun.

Notes

References 

 Bibliography

External links 
 Dakpa Sheri mountain marked on OpenStreetMap
 Tsari. Rangjung Yeshe Wiki - Dharma Dictionary.

Shannan, Tibet
China–India border
Upper Subansiri district
China–India relations